Songs I Wrote and Later Recorded is an independent EP by Jon McLaughlin, released in the United States in May 2005 before signing with Island Records. The second track, "Anthem for American Teenagers" was later rerecorded and used on McLaughlin's Island Records album debut, Indiana.

Track listing

 "Conversations"
 "Anthem for American Teenagers"
 "Spot in Line"
 "The Whole World"
 "Love"
 "One of Four"
 "Places I Already Know"
 "A Song You Might Hear At a Wedding"

External links
Official website
Island Records
Jon McLaughlin's myspace

Jon McLaughlin albums
2005 EPs